FC Davis is a semi-pro association football club based in Davis, California that play in the National Premier Soccer League Golden Gate Conference.

History

FC Davis was founded in 2017 by Adam Lewin. The team began play at Aggie Stadium in Davis, California. The team had one of the strongest attendances in the league as they regularly pulled in 4 digit figures to their ground. The team finished sixth in the Golden Gate Conference on 14 points.

In 2019 FC Davis moved its home matches from the University of California, Davis to Playfields Sports Park. The team is now working on starting a women's club.

Club culture

The club's supporter club, "The Lions Den" was founded in 2019.

Women's team
FC Davis is starting a semi-professional women's squad to compete in the Women's Premier Soccer League

References

External links

Soccer clubs in California
Association football clubs established in 2017
National Premier Soccer League teams
2017 establishments in California